The Gotha G.VII. a.k.a.GL.VII, was a bomber aircraft produced in Germany during the final months of World War I. With the strategic bombing campaign effectively over, it was intended to be a high-speed tactical bomber with a secondary reconnaissance capability. It was a conventional two-bay biplane design with  tractor-mounted engines, and a conventional empennage with twin fins and rudders. The bombardier's position in the nose of the aircraft that had featured on earlier Gotha designs was removed, and the nose of the aircraft severely truncated and fitted with a streamlined nose-cone. This allowed the engines to be located further inboard than on previous designs, bringing them closer to the aircraft's centreline and therefore minimising the effects of asymmetric thrust in the event of an engine failure. The engine nacelles also featured careful streamlining.

The Idflieg ordered around 250 of these aircraft, 50 from Gotha and 50 from LVG, and 150 from Aviatik. At least some of the LVG and Aviatik machines had been completed before the Armistice, with some reaching operational service. One G.VII survived the war to see brief service with the Ukrainian Air Force before being impounded by Czechoslovakia and used by the Czechoslovakian air force for a short time.

Variants
 Gotha G.VII prototype - The original prototype with short nosed fuselage was intended for long-range photographic reconnaissance.

Operators

 Austro-Hungarian Imperial and Royal Aviation Troops

 Czechoslovakian air force (one aircraft taken from Ukrainian Air Force)

 Luftstreitkrafte

 Ukrainian Air Force (one aircraft)

Specifications (Gotha G.VII production)

See also

References
 Gray, Peter & Thetford, Owen. “German Aircraft of the First World War”. London, Putnam.

External links

 Уголок неба

1910s German bomber aircraft
G.VII
Aircraft first flown in 1918